Next → 2017

Archery at the 2015 ASEAN Para Games was held at Kallang Cricket Field, Singapore.

Medal table

Medalists

Men

Women

Mixed

See also
 Archery at the 2015 Southeast Asian Games

References

External links
 8th ASEAN Para Games 2015 - Singapore

2015 ASEAN Para Games
Archery at the ASEAN Para Games